Bumhururu is a lake in the Mashonaland Central Province of Zimbabwe.

References

Lakes of Zimbabwe
Geography of Mashonaland Central Province